Chydarteres is a genus of beetles in the family Cerambycidae, containing the following species:

 Chydarteres bicolor (Fabricius, 1787)
 Chydarteres costatus (Aurivillius, 1908)
 Chydarteres dimidiatus (Fabricius, 1787)
 Chydarteres formosus Galileo & Martins, 2010
 Chydarteres octolineatus (Thunberg, 1822)
 Chydarteres striatellus Huedepohl, 1985
 Chydarteres striatus (Fabricius, 1787)
 Chydarteres strigatus (Dupont, 1836)

References

Trachyderini
Cerambycidae genera